Ahmad Shah Durrani invaded India eight times between 1748 and 1767. After the assassination of Nadir Shah, Ahmad Shah Durrani succeeded the throne of Afghanistan and started plundering wealth from nearby regions. His repeated incursions destroyed the Mughal empire and at Panipat, dealt a major blow to Maratha dominions in the North and created a power vacuum. His objectives were met through the raids (taking the wealth and destroying sacred places belonging to the Indians) and caused political issues in India.

Objectives of his Indian invasions 
Ahmed Shah Abdali invaded India eight times from 1748 to 1767. The frequency of his repeated invasions reflected his "tireless energy, ambition" and purpose.  It was "necessary" for Abdali to invade a "rich but poorly defended neighbouring country" India to plunder and exploit her resources. He also wanted to establish "political hegemony" in India. During his time, the Mughal empire was disintegrating and he was "eager to step into the shoes of the decadent Mughal authority" to fill up the "political vacuum without any loss of time".

First Invasion (1747-1748)

Civil War in Lahore (1745-1747) 
Following the death of Zakariya Khan the governor of Lahore in July of 1745,the Mughal Wazier Qamaruddin Khan would appoint the two sons of Zakariya Khan as the governors of Lahore and Multan.Yahya Khan the son of Zakariya Khan was appointed governor of Lahore,and Shah Nawaz was appointed governor of Multan.Yahya Khan's administration over Lahore would soon be challenged by his brother Shah Nawaz,who soon arrived in Lahore on November of 1746.Shah Nawaz demanded a complete division of their dead father's property.This dispute over Zakariya Khan's estate resulted in a war between the two brothers and their armies which lasted from November 1746 to March of 1747.

On March, 17, 1747,Shah Nawaz was able to defeat Yahya Khan and had held him in captivity.Shah Nawaz usurped the governorship over Lahore and appointed Kaura Mal as his diwan and recognized Adina Beg Khan as faujdar of the Jalandhar Doaba.Shah Nawaz began negotiating with the Delhi government to recognize his governorship over the province,and used his captive brother as a bargaining tool.However instead the Mughal emperor Muhammad Shah threatened direct military action against Shah Nawaz.Yahya Khan was also able to escape from Shah Nawaz's captivity and fled towards Delhi.Shah Nawaz soon began looking for foreign help.Shah Nawaz had heard of the military exploits of Ahmad Shah Durrani who had just  taken Kabul and Peshawar from the Mughal governor Nasir Khan.After being advised by Adina Beg Khan,Shah Nawaz decided to invite Ahmed Shah for Military help.Ahmed Shah agreed to the request on the condition that Shah Nawaz accept Afghan suzerainty, and he soon began his invasion from Peshawar on December of 1747.

Battle of Lahore (January, 11, 1748) 

Adina Beg soon informed the Delhi government of Shah Nawaz's treachery.Qamaruddin Khan was disappointed at hearing the news and soon wrote a letter to Shah Nawaz.In this letter Qamaruddin Khan agreed to recognize Shah Nawaz's control over Lahore on the condition that he oppose Ahmad Shah's forces.Shah Nawaz agreed to the wazir's request and he now turned hostile towards the Afghans.Jahan Khan had crossed the Indus river with 8,000 of his men.Shah Nawaz fought the Afghan force and forced Jahan Khan to retreat towards Peshawar,where Jahan Khan waited for Ahmad Shah's forces to arrive.Ahmad Shah entered the Punjab and occupied the fort of Rohtas.When he heard news of Shah Nawaz changing his allegiance to the Mughals, he sent Sabir Shah and Muhammad Yar Khan to Lahore.However Shah Nawaz felt insulted by the remarks made by Sabir Shah and ordered him to be executed, while Muhammad Yar Khan was let go.Hearing news of Sabir Shah's execution,Ahmad Shah began his march towards the city of Lahore.He also confirmed the holdings of Rawalpindi to Muqarrab Khan a Gakkhar chief during Ahmad Shah's journey towards Gujrat

Ahmad Shah Durrani had around 18,000 Afghan soldiers under his command,one third of which where from his own tribe.Durrani's army however lacked any artillery and was much smaller compared to the Mughals.Shah Nawaz had around 70,000 Soldiers under his command along with artillery.On January, 10, 1748, Durrani and his army camped near the Shalamar gardens.The Afghan and Mughal Forces would fight one another on January, 11, 1748.

Khwajah Asmatullah Khan, one of the Mughal commanders, had around 10,000 cavalry and 5,000 Musketeers, while Lachin beg another commander had around 5,000 soldiers.According to Historian Sir Jadhunath Sarkar,Asmatullah and Lachin Beg had around 16,000 soldiers under their command.Shah Nawaz sent Jalhe Khan,a Pashtun commander from Kasur,to oppose Durrani's forces.However instead Jalhe Khan defected to the Afghan side and Joined Ahmad Shah Durrani.Ahmad Shah sent 1,000 of his musketeers to fire upon the Mughal forces and to retreat beyond the enemies range.Shah Nawaz soon consulted a astrologer to know the result of the battle.The astrologer told Shah Nawaz that there should not be any fighting that day and to instead attack the Afghans the next day.Shah Nawaz agreed to this advice and told his officers Adina Beg and Diwan Kaura mal not to move out and oppose the Afghan forces and to only fight the Afghans within the Mughal entrenchments. 

Ahmad Shah was able to overpower the Qizilbash soldiers of the Mughal army and began pursuing them into their entrenchments.Asmatullah Khan began calling in for reinforcements.Adina Beg failed in properly reinforcing Asmatullah and Adina Beg soon fled towards Lahore.Some of the Mughal soldiers took this as a sign of a ceasefire, and retreated to their trenches in complete disorder.The Afghans now launched a full scale attack on the Mughal forces which forced Asmatullah Khan to retreat.The various guns and artillery that was stored in the fort of Hazrat Ishan fell in the hands of the Afghan forces.Adina Beg fired cannons and rockets onto the Afghan forces, however the Afghans were able to overpower the resistance offered by the Mughals.Shah Nawaz escaped Lahore and fled towards Delhi.Asmatullah Khan was killed during the battle.

Ahmad Shah Durrani and the Afghan forces entered Lahore on January, 12, 1748.The previous members of the Lahore government that had been imprisoned by Shah Nawaz were released by the Afghans.Mir Momin Khan, Lakhpath Rai and Surat Singh all pleaded to Durrani to spare the city from plunder and paid a ransom to the Afghans.Ahmad Shah accepted the ransom and ordered his officers to make sure the Afghan soldiers wouldn't subject the city to plunder.Despite this, some parts of the city were looted by the Afghan forces.Various Guns, artillery, treasure and other goods all fell in the hands of the Afghan forces following their conquest of Lahore.Coins were also minted in the name of Ahmad Shah Durrani.Thousands of Women and Children were enslaved by the Afghans after their conquest of Lahore.The Afghans also conscripted thousands of Punjabis into the Afghan army.Ahmad Shah appointed Jalhe Khan of Kasur as the new governor of Lahore,with Mir Momin Khan as his deputy and Lakhpath Rai as his Diwan.Ahmad Shah stayed in the city of Lahore for 5 weeks and began his plans to advance towards Delhi.Durrani attacked India in 1748. He had faced Mughal, Rajput and Sikh coalitions in Sirhind, Ahmad Shah's Afghan troops swept aside the Mughal army's left flank (of Rajput stock) and raided their baggage train but a fire beginning in a captured rocket cart went on to ignite the Durrani artillery store, roasting thousands of soldiers alive and forcing Ahmad Shah Durrani's retreat. After the retreat of Durrani, Sikh bands under Charat Singh continued to harass them as they retreated to Kabul. he had to return home in failure. He lost to the Mughal soldiers, Rajput force's and Sikhs of the Phulkian Misl (also known as the Patiala State).

Second Invasion 
Ahmad Shah Durrani marched on India the next year to avenge his defeat.
This invasion resulted in the Afghans achieving victory and taking control of the territory to the west of Indus. He made an alliance with Nawab Muzaffar Khan of Multan and Ahmed Khan Sial of Jhang. This paved the way for his invasion of Punjab.

Third Invasion 

In the winter of 1751, he invaded India for the third time on the pretext that Mir Mannu, the Mughal governor of the province of Punjab, had refused to pay him tax which he had promised to give on a monthly basis. Abdali started the battle by successfully besieging Mannu in the Lahore Fort. Though Mannu wrote to the Mughal emperor Ahmad Shah Bahadur for help, he received no reinforcements from Delhi. Failing to put up a fight, he surrendered to Abdali on 6 March 1752. After signing the instrument of surrender, Abdali's forces looted and plundered the city. On his orders, nine hundred Sikhs who were trapped in the fort of Ram Rauni were killed. But Abdali was impressed by the "heroic fight" put up by the Mughal governor; so he appointed him as the province's governor on his own behalf. Abdali also conferred him the title "Farzand Khan Bahadur Rustam-e-Hind".

Consequently, Mannu held a reception at Lahore in honour of Abdali. He also signed a peace treaty under which the two territories of Punjab – Multan and Lahore - were to be ceded to Abdali's Afghan empire. Once the treaty was signed, Abdali sent his troops to Multan to take possession of the city and some of his men to Delhi to confirm the treaty with the Mughal emperor Ahmad Shah Bahadur. Bahadur, with advice from the royal advisor Javed Khan, put his seal on the treaty on 3 April, which cut Punjab from the Mughal empire. At that time, the wazir of Delhi Safdar Jang was in Awadh to suppress a rebellion. He returned at the end of the month with fresh recruits to confront Abdali, but learned of the treaty and retreated.

Fourth Invasion 

Ahmed Shah Durrani invaded again along with his son Timur Shah Durrani in 1756 on the invitation of Mughlani Begum, the wife of Mir Mannu, late subedar of Punjab under Mughal Empire. They conquered the Mughal cities of Lahore, Sirhind, Delhi, Mathura, Vrindavan. And they were able to take women slaves including daughters of late emperor Muhammad Shah and Alamgir II along with of other Hindu women from towns of Mathura, Vrindavan and Agra.

Further the troops of Adina Beg fought together against Afghans at Hoshiarpur known as the Battle of Mahilpur.Later troops of 20,000 horsemen of Timur Shah Durrani was defeated and captured by Sikhs. This resulted in insecurity in mind of Adina Beg, who invited the Marathas, who had taken Delhi to come to Punjab and recapture Lahore resulting in the Maratha conquest of North-west India. Marathas rout Afghans from Lahore by March 1758. Adina became subedar of Punjab, by promising 75 lakh rupees a year to be paid to Marathas. The Chief Qazi of Lahore fearing Hindu domination by Marathas invited Ahmed Shah Abdali to Punjab, causing his sixth invasion.

 Durrani occupation of Delhi (1757)
 Battle of Bharatpur (1757) 
It was fought between Jats and Abdali's forces. Maharaja Surajmal's troops fought against him in Ballabgarh, Chaumunha, Gokul, Kumher and in Bharatpur. At last Abdali had to leave the war and retreat. During this he ruined and looted the holy places of Mathura and Vrindavan.
 Battle of Amritsar (1757)

The battle was fought between the Nihang Sikhs of the Shaheedan Misl and the Afghans. In this battle the Nihang Sikhs of the Shaheedan Misl forced the Afghans to withdraw, Although their leader Baba Deep Singh ji was martyred.

Fifth invasion

 Battle of Lahore (1759)
 Battle of Attock (1758)
 Battle of Peshawar (1758)
 Battle of Barari Ghat
 Second Battle of Sikandarabad (1760)
 Siege of Kunjpura (1760)
 Third Battle of Panipat (1761)
 Battle of Gujranwala (1761)
 Battle of Sialkot (1761)
 Siege of Lahore (1761) .
The Fifth Invasion was the most crucial of the invasions. In this invasion, the Marathas lost the battle of Panipat and lost Delhi, Punjab, Lahore, Multan and Attock. They lost many civilians and soldiers and Ahmed Shah Durrani freely plundered them. Later, in all his next invasions, he fought against the Sikhs on every occasion, where he was less successful and the Sikhs became stronger. In the end the Sikhs drove him away from India all the way back to the Indus.

Sixth Invasion 

 Battle of Harnaulgarh
 Battle of Pipli Sahib
 Battle of Kup also known as Sikh genocide of 1762.
 Battle of the Ravi Ford (1762)
 Battle of Sialkot (1763)
In November 1766 Abdali came to the Punjab for the eight time with the avowed object of "crushing the Sikhs". The Sikhs had recourse to their old game of Dhai-phut('hit, run and turn back to hit again') tactics (later made famous at the Battle of Chillianwala against the British). They vacated Lahore, but faced squarely the Afghan general, Jahan Khan at Amritsar. Inflicting a humiliating defeat, and forcing him to retreat, with five thousand Afghan soldiers killed. Jassa Singh Ahluwalia with an army of about twenty thousand Sikhs roamed in the neighbourhood of the Afghan camp, plundering it.

Seventh Invasion (1764–1767) 

 Battle of Sirhind (1764)
 Battle of Darbar Sahib (1764)
Jassa Singh continued with his campaigns. After Abdali's ninth and last invasion in 1769, Jassa Singh wrested Kapurthala in 1774 from Rao Ibrahim Bhatti and made it his headquarters and capital. This later became the Kapurthala State.

Death of Abdali 
When Abdali was invading the Punjab in 1762, he ordered that the Golden Temple in Amritsar be blown up with gunpowder. The amount of gunpowder used for the demolition far exceeded what was necessary and the resultant explosion sent bricks flying away for miles. One of these bricks is said to have directly struck the Afghan invader on the nose whilst he was supervising the demolition. The resultant injury turned cancerous, which gradually worsened and became infected with maggots. Abdali died a painful death at Toba Mar (or Toba Maruf; present-day Maruf, Afghanistan) in the Suleiman Mountains on 16 October 1772 as a result of the injury he sustained from his act of iconoclasm in Amritsar.

Overview 
Ahmad Shah Abdali had accompanied Nadir Shah to Delhi in 1739, and had seen the weakness of the ruler there. To pay for the maintenance of the army, he had to conquer new lands.

In 1747, Ahmad Shah then began his career as head of the Abdali tribe by capturing Ghazni from the Ghilzai Pashtuns, and then wresting Kabul from the local ruler, and thus strengthened his hold over most of present-day Afghanistan. Leadership of the various Afghan tribes rested mainly on the ability to provide booty for the clan, and Ahmed Shah proved remarkably successful in providing both booty and occupation for his followers. Apart from invading the Punjab three times between the years 1747–1753, he captured territory to the west as well.

In December 1747, Ahmed Shah set out from Peshawar and arrived at the Indus river-crossing at Attock. From there, he sent his messenger to Lahore but reception from Shah Nawaz was frosty. When Ahmed Shah reached the bank of the Ravi on 8 January 1748, the Lahore army of 70,000 prepared to oppose the invader. The Pashtun army crossed over on 10 January and the battle was joined on the 11th. Ahmed Shah had only 30,000 horsemen, and no artillery. But during the Battle of Manupur (1748), a force of 5,000 Pathans of Qasoor under Jamal Khan defected to his side, and he was able to crush the poorly trained forces of Lahore. Shah Nawaz fled to Delhi, and Adina Beg was equally fast in running away to the Jalandhar area.

Ahmed Shah entered the city on 12 January 1748, and set free Moman Khan and Lakhpat Rai. He then ordered a general massacre. Towards evening, the prominent leaders of the city including Moman Khan, Lakhpat Rai and Surat Singh collected a sum of three million rupees and offered it as expenses to Abdali, requesting him to halt the looting and slaughter. Ahmed Shah appointed Jamal Khan of Qasoor Governor of Lahore, and Lakhpat Rai his minister, and restoring law and order around the town by 18 February, he set out towards Delhi.

Meanwhile, in the preceding three years, the Sikhs had occupied the city of Lahore, and Ahmed Shah had to return in 1751 to oust them.

Then in 1756/57, in what was his fourth invasion of India, Ahmed Shah sacked Delhi looting every corner of that city and enriching himself with what remained of that city's wealth after Nadir Shah's invasion in 1739. However, he did not displace the Mughal dynasty, which remained in nominal control as long as the ruler acknowledged Ahmad's suzerainty over the Punjab, Sindh, and Kashmir. He installed a puppet Emperor, Alamgir II, on the Mughal throne, and arranged marriages for himself and his son Timur into the Imperial family that same year. Leaving his second son Timur Shah (who was wed to the daughter of Alamgir II) to safeguard his interests, Ahmad finally left India to return to Afghanistan. On his way back, Ahmed Shah captured Amritsar (1757), and sacked the Sikhs' holy temple of Golden Temple.

In 1761, Ahmad Shah and Marathas were at war, called the Third Battle of Panipat with heavy casualties on both sides. Ahmed shah returned to kabul and after ten years Maratha army recaptured Delhi in 1771 and in 1772 Marathas invaded rohilkhand doab area. Marathas looted and devastated of rohilas and pathans in rohilkhand.

As early as by the end of 1761, the Sikhs had begun to occupy much of Punjab. In 1762, Ahmad Shah crossed the passes from Afghanistan for the sixth time to crush the Sikhs. He assaulted Lahore and Amritsar (the holy city of the Sikhs), massacred thousands of Sikh inhabitants, destroyed their temples and again desecrated their holy places.

Within two years, the Sikhs rebelled again, and he launched another campaign against them in December 1764. However, he soon had to depart from India and hastened westward to quell an insurrection in Afghanistan.

After the departure of Ahmad Shah Durrani, Jassa Singh Ahluwalia attacked Sirhind and in the Battle of Sirhind (1764), the Afghan Governor Zain Khan Sirhindi was killed. Jassa Singh also paid a visit to Darbar Sahib at Amritsar, and restored it to its original shape after defilement by Durrani.

Later the Sikhs under Hari Singh Nalwa Campaigned against the Afghans in the third phase of the Afghan Sikh wars and they took even the Winter capital of the Afghans Peshawar, Decisively defeating Afghans in Battle of Nowshera which led to their occupation of the Peshawar Valley.

Following their victory, the Sikhs destroyed the Afghan royal court and the fort of Bala Hissar, Peshawar. However, Hari Singh Nalwa soon commenced the reconstruction of the fort.

See also 

 Dal Khalsa (Sikh army)
 Afghan-Sikh Wars

References 

 
 

Military history of India
18th century in the Durrani Empire